Serge Bourdoncle (24 January 1936 – 10 October 2020) was a French football player and coach.

Career
Born in Milhars, Bourdoncle played as a midfielder for Sochaux, Nîmes, Bordeaux, Franc-Comtois and Metz. With Sochaux he was runner-up in the 1959 Coupe de France, and the winner of the Coupe Charles Drago in 1963 and 1964.

He later became a coach, managing Algrange.

Honours
Sochaux
 Coupe de France runner-up – 1959
 Coupe Charles Drago winner – 1963, 1964

References

1936 births
2020 deaths
French footballers
FC Sochaux-Montbéliard players
Nîmes Olympique players
FC Girondins de Bordeaux players
FC Metz players
Ligue 1 players
Ligue 2 players
Association football midfielders
French football managers
AS Algrange managers